Ricardo Modesto da Silva (born January 20, 1979) is a former Brazilian football player.

Club statistics

References

External links

consadeconsa.com

1979 births
Living people
Brazilian footballers
Brazilian expatriate footballers
Expatriate footballers in Japan
J2 League players
Hokkaido Consadole Sapporo players
Association football forwards